Li Yan (born July 17, 1980) is a Chinese professional racing cyclist.

Career highlights

 2005
 2005–2006 World Cup
 2nd, Points race, Manchester

 2006
 2005–2006 World Cup
 3rd, Points race, Los Angeles
 2006–2007 World Cup
 3rd, Points race, Sydney
 Asian Games, Doha
 1st, Points race

 2007
 2007–2008 World Cup
 2nd, Points race, Sydney

 2008
 2007–2008 World Cup
 3rd, Points race, Los Angeles

External links

1980 births
Living people
Chinese female cyclists
Chinese track cyclists
Cyclists at the 2008 Summer Olympics
Olympic cyclists of China
Place of birth missing (living people)
Asian Games medalists in cycling
Cyclists at the 2006 Asian Games
Asian Games gold medalists for China
Medalists at the 2006 Asian Games
21st-century Chinese women